YouVersion (also known as Bible.com or the Bible App) is an online and mobile Bible platform published for Android, iOS, Windows Phone, and many other operating platforms. In 2022, according to YouVersion, its Bible App features 2,863 Bible versions in 1,868 languages, audio Bibles, offline capabilities, as well as over 800 Bible plans and devotionals.

History 
YouVersion was founded in 2008 by Bobby Gruenewald and Life.Church. Since at least 2012, it has been sponsored by David Green, the billionaire founder and owner of Hobby Lobby Stores, Inc. In April 2014, YouVersion released version 5 of the Bible App, which added features for community engagement and scripture discussion. In April 2016, The Bible App became available on the Apple Watch allowing users to read the Verse of the Day, view trending verses, and access their own Verse Images, Bookmarks, and Highlights. By April 2017, YouVersion had been downloaded over 268 million times and offered 1492 versions of the Bible in 1074 languages. In March 2017, YouVersion launched a service using Google Assistant on Google Home devices, enabling users to request Bible verses based on their moods and emotions. In November 2021, YouVersion reached 500 million downloads.

Controversy 
YouVersion has been accused of over collecting data from its users since 2013. As recently as 2019, the Android version of the app was requiring access to all the users contact information (their address book) and the users GPS location.  YouVersion has updated their privacy policies as of April 2, 2022.

References

External links
 

Christian websites
Bible versions and translations
Online Scripture Search Engine
Internet properties established in 1993
Android (operating system) software
BlackBerry software
Electronic Bibles
Internet properties established in 2008
IOS software
Universal Windows Platform apps